Bernd Olbricht (born 17 October 1956 in Gnoien) is an East German sprint canoeist who competed in the late 1970s and early 1980s. Competing in two Summer Olympics, he won four medals with two golds (1976: K-2 500 m, 1980: K-4 1000 m), one silver (1976: K-2 1000 m), and one bronze (1980: K-2 500 m).

Olbricht also won six medals at the ICF Canoe Sprint World Championships with four golds (K-2 500 m: 1977, 1978; K-4 1000 m: 1978, 1979) and two silvers (K-2 500 m: 1979, K-2 1000 m: 1977).

References

External links
 
 

1956 births
Living people
People from Rostock (district)
People from Bezirk Neubrandenburg
German male canoeists
Sportspeople from Mecklenburg-Western Pomerania
Olympic canoeists of East Germany
Canoeists at the 1976 Summer Olympics
Canoeists at the 1980 Summer Olympics
Olympic gold medalists for East Germany
Olympic silver medalists for East Germany
Olympic bronze medalists for East Germany
Olympic medalists in canoeing
ICF Canoe Sprint World Championships medalists in kayak
Recipients of the Patriotic Order of Merit in silver
Medalists at the 1980 Summer Olympics
Medalists at the 1976 Summer Olympics